The Fort LeBoeuf School District is a public school district serving parts of Erie County, Pennsylvania. It encompasses the communities Summit Township, Waterford, Waterford Township, LeBoeuf Township and Mill Village. It has five schools:
Waterford Elementary
Robison Elementary
Mill Village Elementary
Fort LeBoeuf Middle
Fort LeBoeuf High School.

There are currently more than 600 students attending the high school. After the fifth grade, all students from Mill Village, Waterford and Robison Elementary join in the middle school. Then, they continue to the high school, which is  next to the middle school.

Famous alumni 
1961 - Wally Mahle
1991 - Brian Milne
2003 - Alaska Thunderfuck 5000

References 

School districts in Erie County, Pennsylvania